Juan Juániz de Echalar (died 13 October 1656) was a Roman Catholic prelate who served as Bishop of Calahorra y La Calzada (1647–1656) and Bishop of Mondoñedo (1644–1647).

Biography
On 28 November 1644, Juan Juániz de Echalar was selected by the King of Spain and confirmed by Pope Innocent X on 31 July 1645 as Bishop of Mondoñedo. He was consecrated bishop by Diego Arce Reinoso, Bishop of Plasencia, with Miguel Avellán, Titular Bishop of Siriensis, and Pedro Urbina Montoya, Bishop of Coria, serving as co-consecrators. On 16 December 1647, he was appointed during the papacy of Pope Innocent X as Bishop of Calahorra y La Calzada. He served as Bishop of Calahorra y La Calzada until his death on 13 October 1656.

References

External links and additional sources
 (for Chronology of Bishops) 
 (for Chronology of Bishops) 
 (for Chronology of Bishops)
 (for Chronology of Bishops)

17th-century Roman Catholic bishops in Spain
Bishops appointed by Pope Innocent X
1656 deaths